Bengtol College, is the higher educational institution located in the district of Chirang, Assam, India. The college is affiliated to Bodoland University.

History
The concept of establishing Bengtol College was started in 1977. An ad hoc committee was set up educationally conscious to achieve the purpose. As there was no official construction due to several reasons. The college was started in 1981. The first classes were started on 1 August 1997 with comprising 7 students in B.A 1st year and 3 teachers. The pioneers of college were Bhobeh Chowary, Shri Eona Narzary, Sunil Bhowmick, and Ranjit Kr Narzary.

Colleges in India
Bodoland University
1981 establishments in India